Nasrabad (also Romanized as Naşrābād; also known as Naşārābād and Naşrābād-e Pā’īn) is a village in Ghazali Rural District, Miyan Jolgeh District, Nishapur County, Razavi Khorasan Province, Iran. At the 2006 census, its population was 316, in 84 families.

References 

Populated places in Nishapur County